Niamh Fisher-Black (born 12 August 2000) is a New Zealand professional racing cyclist, who currently rides for UCI Women's WorldTeam . She is the older sister of fellow racing cyclist Finn Fisher-Black, and was educated at Nelson College for Girls.

Fisher-Black paid her own way to the 2022 road cycling world championships in Wollongong, Australia as Cycling New Zealand could not afford to meet the costs due to due "a lack of government funding and the loss of key sponsors". In the 164 km road race, she was the first placed under-23 rider and 12th overall. She became the first under-23 world women's champion. Fisher-Black said of the win “I wasn't aware straightaway at first when I crossed the line [that I’d won the under-23 race]." “The rainbow jersey, very few people have one and it’s the pinnacle of cycling so it’s super special to have...I think I showed I was the strongest under-23 rider on the day and nothing can take away from that.”

Major results

2016
 1st  National Junior CX Championships
2017
 1st  National Junior CX Championships
 3rd Road race, National Junior Road Championships
2018
 9th Road race, Oceania Junior Road Championships
2019
 4th Road race, National Junior Road Championships
 9th Gravel and Tar 
2020
 1st  Road race, National Road Championships
 National Under-23 Road Championships
1st  Road race
3rd Time trial
 1st Gravel and Tar
2021
 1st  Young rider classification, Vuelta a Burgos Feminas
 1st  Young rider classification, Ladies Tour of Norway
 9th Overall Giro d'Italia
1st  Young rider classification
2022
 1st  Road race, UCI Road World Under-23 Championships
 1st  Young rider classification, Grand Prix Elsy Jacobs
 5th Overall Giro d'Italia
1st  Young rider classification
 5th Durango-Durango Emakumeen Saria
 7th Overall Itzulia Tour
1st  Young rider classification

References

External links

2000 births
Living people
New Zealand female cyclists
Sportspeople from Nelson, New Zealand
People educated at Nelson College for Girls
21st-century New Zealand women